The 2006–07 Argentine Primera B Nacional was the 21st season of second division professional of football in Argentina. A total of 20 teams competed; the champion and runner-up were promoted to Argentine Primera División.

Club information

Torneo Apertura standings

Torneo Clausura standings

Overall standings

Promotion playoff
This leg was played between the Apertura and the Clausura winner, but  as Olimpo won both tournaments, was declared champion and was automatically promoted to 2007–08 Primera División, so the match was played between the best teams placed in the overall standings under Olimpo, San Martín (SJ) and Huracán. The winning team was promoted to 2007–08 Primera División and the losing team played the Promotion Playoff Primera División-Primera B Nacional.

|-
!colspan="5"|Promotion Playoff

Torneo Reducido
It was played by the teams placed 4th, 5th 6th and 7th in the Overall Standings: Atlético de Rafaela (4th), Tigre (5th), Chacarita Juniors (6th) and Platense (7th). The winning team played the Promotion Playoff Primera División-Primera B Nacional.

Semifinals

|-
!colspan="5"|Semifinals

!colspan="5"|Semifinals

1: Qualified because of sport advantage.

Final

|-
!colspan="5"|Semifinals

Promotion playoff Primera División-Primera B Nacional
The Promotion playoff loser (Huracán) and the Torneo Reducido winner (Tigre) played against the 18th and the 17th placed of the Relegation Table of 2006–07 Primera División.

|-
!colspan="5"|Relegation/promotion playoff 1

|-
!colspan="5"|Relegation/promotion playoff 2

Huracán was promoted to 2007–08 Primera División by winning the playoff and Godoy Cruz was relegated to 2007–08 Primera B Nacional.
Tigre was promoted to 2007–08 Primera División by winning the playoff and Nueva Chicago was relegated to 2007–08 Primera B Nacional.

Relegation

1: Had to play a tiebreaker to see which team played Promotion/relegation Legs.

Note: Clubs with indirect affiliation with AFA are relegated to the Torneo Argentino A, while clubs directly affiliated face relegation to Primera B Metropolitana. Clubs with direct affiliation are all from Greater Buenos Aires, with the exception of Newell's, Rosario Central, Central Córdoba and Argentino de Rosario, all from Rosario, and Unión and Colón from Santa Fe.

Tiebreaker

Relegation playoff matches

|-
!colspan="5"|Relegation/promotion playoff 1 (Direct affiliation vs. Primera B Metropolitana)

|-
!colspan="5"|Relegation/promotion playoff 2 (Indirect affiliation vs. Torneo Argentino A)

|-
|}

 Ferro Carril Oeste remains in Primera B Nacional after a 1-1 aggregate tie by virtue of a "sports advantage". In case of a tie in goals, the team from the Primera B Nacional gets to stay in it.
 Ben Hur remained in the Primera B Nacional by winning the playoff.

See also
2006–07 in Argentine football

References

External links

2006–07 in Argentine football leagues
Primera B Nacional seasons